TSS Gertrude was a passenger vessel launched for the London, Tilbury and Southend Railway in 1905.

History

Gertrude was built by A. W. Robertson and Company for the London, Tilbury and Southend Railway as a Gravesend-Tilbury Ferry. She was launched in 1905.

She was acquired by the Midland Railway in 1912 and the London, Midland and Scottish Railway in 1923. She was sold in 1932 to the New Medway Steam Packet Company and renamed Rochester Queen. She was sold again to M.H. Bland in Gibraltar and renamed Caid. In 1949 she was renamed Djebel Derif and was scrapped in 1962.

References

1905 ships
Passenger ships of the United Kingdom
Steamships of the United Kingdom
Ships built on the River Thames
Ships of the Midland Railway
Ships of the London, Tilbury and Southend Railway
Ships of the London, Midland and Scottish Railway
Ships of the New Medway Steam Packet Company